Trenton Historic District is a national historic district located at Trenton, Jones County, North Carolina. It encompasses 15 contributing buildings and 1 contributing site in the town of Trenton.  It includes notable examples of Italianate, Gothic Revival, and Federal style architecture and buildings largely dating from the mid- to late-19th century. Located in the district is the separately listed Grace Episcopal Church.  Other notable buildings include the Grace Episcopal Church Parish House, Jacob Huggins House (1820-1835), Smith House (c. 1820), Kinsey House, Franks House, Henderson House, McDaniel-Dixon House, the United Methodist Church, Trenton Pentecostal Holiness Church, the old jail, and Bank of Jones County (1908).

It was listed on the National Register of Historic Places in 1974.

References

Historic districts on the National Register of Historic Places in North Carolina
Federal architecture in North Carolina
Gothic Revival architecture in North Carolina
Italianate architecture in North Carolina
Buildings and structures in Jones County, North Carolina
National Register of Historic Places in Jones County, North Carolina